Emma Wilson (born 7 April 1999) is a British windsurfer who won a bronze medal in the RS:X event at the 2020 Summer Olympics in Tokyo, Japan. She won the RS:X events at the Youth Sailing World Championships in 2016 and 2017, and won medals at the 2018 and 2019 RS:X European Championships, and the 2022 IQFoil European Championships.

Personal life
Emma Wilson was born on 7 April 1999 in Nottingham. She grew up in Christchurch, Dorset. She is the daughter of Penny Wilson ( Way), who competed at the 1992 and 1996 Summer Olympics. Her older brother Dan is also a professional sailor. When she was younger, Wilson played hockey at regional level in addition to sailing.

Career
Wilson has trained alongside Bryony Shaw, who won bronze at the 2008 Summer Olympics. Aged 12, she won the U15 Techno 293 World Championships, and the U15 RS:X event. In 2015, she came second at the RS:X event at the Youth Sailing World Championships. She later won the event in 2016, and 2017. She won the 2017/18 UK Windsurfing Association Windsurfer of the Year award.

At the 2018 Sailing World Championships in Aarhus, Denmark, Wilson won the opening RS:X race by over a minute. She eventually finished fourth at the event. In the same year, she came 6th at the Sailing World Cup event in Enoshima, and came third at the RS:X European Championships in Gdańsk, Poland. She came third overall, and second European, at the 2019 RS:X European Championships in Palma de Mallorca, and came fourth at the 2020 RS:X World Championships, 11 points behind third place.

Wilson qualified to compete in the RS:X event at the 2020 Summer Olympics in Tokyo, Japan. After the Olympics were postponed from 2020 to 2021, British Sailing confirmed that their squad selection were unchanged, and so Wilson was still selected for the Games. She finished fourth in the Olympic test event in 2019.

At the Games, Wilson finished first, second and fourth in the three races on the second day, finishing the day second overall, tied on points with leader Charline Picon. On the third day of racing at the Games, Wilson won two of the three races, and moved into first place overall. After the fourth and final day of heats, Wilson was second behind China's Lu Yunxiu. She eventually finished third in the event.

In 2022, Wilson came second at the IQFoil European Championships, her first major event in the iQFoil class.

References

External links
 
 
 
 

1999 births
Living people
English windsurfers
British female sailors (sport)
Olympic sailors of Great Britain
Olympic bronze medallists for Great Britain
Olympic medalists in sailing
Sailors at the 2020 Summer Olympics – RS:X
Medalists at the 2020 Summer Olympics
Sportspeople from Nottingham
People from Christchurch, Dorset
Sportspeople from Dorset